Deneva Cagigas Carranco  (born 1 April 1995) is a Mexican professional football defender who currently plays for UNAM of the Liga MX Femenil.

Playing career
Cagigas was selected as a player UNAM during the inaugural season of the Liga MX Femenil. She made her debut for the club as a starter in the 2017 Apertura tournament against C.F. Pachuca. In 2019, she captained the team.

Other work
Cagigas has been an ambassador for adidas since 2018.

References

External links
 

1995 births
Living people
Mexican women's footballers
Footballers from Mexico City
Liga MX Femenil players
Club Universidad Nacional (women) footballers
Women's association football defenders
21st-century Mexican women
20th-century Mexican women
Mexican footballers